Cerithiopsis ladae is a species of sea snail, a gastropod in the family Cerithiopsidae. It was described by Prkic and Buzzurro in 2007.

References

ladae
Gastropods described in 2007